Gabriel Mutombo Kupa (born 19 January 1996) is a French professional footballer who plays as a defender for Liga I club Botoșani.

Club career
After ten years in the academy of Olympique Lyonnais, Mutombo was let go and joined the youth teams of Angers SCO. He signed his first professional contract in the summer of 106, before joining CA Bastia on loan for the 2016–17 season, and then joining US Orléans on loan on 28 June 2017 for the 2017–18 season. He made his professional debut for Orléans in a 1–0 Ligue 2 loss to US Quevilly-Rouen on 17 November 2017.

Orléans converted Mutombo's loan into a three-year contract in June 2018.

In August 2020, Mutombo moved to Troyes AC, signing a two-year deal.

On 25 January 2022, he joined Vilafranquense in Portugal on loan.

International career
Born in France, Mutombo is of Congolese descent, and was called up to the DR Congo national under-20 football team for a friendly against the France U20s, but did not make an appearance because he was mourning the death of his brother.

Honours
Troyes
Ligue 2: 2020–21

References

External links
 
 
 Sofoot Profile

1996 births
Living people
People from Villeurbanne
Association football defenders
French footballers
French sportspeople of Democratic Republic of the Congo descent
US Orléans players
CA Bastia players
Angers SCO players
ES Troyes AC players
U.D. Vilafranquense players
Ligue 2 players
Championnat National players
Liga Portugal 2 players
Liga I players
FC Botoșani players
French expatriate footballers
Expatriate footballers in Portugal
French expatriate sportspeople in Portugal
Sportspeople from Lyon Metropolis
Footballers from Auvergne-Rhône-Alpes
Black French sportspeople